Ap'ak'idze is a Georgian family with noble ancestry. According to a family legend, the Apakidze descend from Arp’a-Khan, "a Tatar of Genghis Khan’s times", who embraced Christianity and settled down in Abkhazia whence his descendants moved to Mingrelia where their princely title was confirmed.  

The Apakidze had been vassals to the Dadiani princes of Mingrelia, and then were confirmed as princes (knyaz) of the Russian Empire in 1867 and 1903.

References 

Noble families of Georgia (country)
Russian noble families